Albert Harrington (born February 17, 1980) is an American former professional basketball player. Selected with the 25th overall pick in the 1998 NBA draft, Harrington played 16 seasons in the National Basketball Association (NBA) for the Indiana Pacers, Atlanta Hawks, Golden State Warriors, New York Knicks, Denver Nuggets, Orlando Magic and Washington Wizards. He also spent a short stint with the Fujian Sturgeons of the Chinese Basketball Association (CBA).

Since retiring from the NBA, Harrington has become an entrepreneur in the cannabis industry.  Harrington is a cousin of former NBA player and Los Angeles Clippers assistant coach Dahntay Jones.

Early life
Born in Orange, New Jersey, Harrington grew up in Roselle, New Jersey and played high school basketball at St. Patrick High School in Elizabeth, New Jersey. He was named both Gatorade and USA Today's National Player of the Year, as well as a 1998 McDonald's High School All-American after his senior season.

Professional career

Indiana Pacers (1998–2004)
At only 18 years of age, Harrington was selected by the Indiana Pacers with the 25th overall pick in the 1998 NBA draft, making him the first player born in the 1980s to be drafted by the NBA. Harrington spent six seasons with the Pacers, primarily coming off the bench. Harrington really began to come into his own in the 2001–02 season, in which he averaged 13.1 points and 6.3 rebounds per game, but his season came to an end in a game against the Boston Celtics when he suffered a knee injury that forced him to miss the final 38 games of the season.

He made a comeback in the 2002–03 season, becoming the only Pacer to play in all 82 games that year. He averaged 12.2 points and 6.0 rebounds per game while starting in 37 games. The following season, he boosted his averages slightly to 13.3 points and 6.4 rebounds per game, and finished second in voting for the NBA Sixth Man of the Year Award. He was an integral part of the Pacers' first run to the Eastern Conference Finals since 2000.

Atlanta Hawks (2004–2006)
On July 15, 2004, Harrington was traded to the Atlanta Hawks in exchange for Stephen Jackson. Harrington finally became a nightly starter, but the Hawks did not fare as successfully as the Pacers did after his departure.

Second run with Pacers (2006–2007)
On August 22, 2006, Harrington and John Edwards were acquired by the Indiana Pacers from the Atlanta Hawks in a sign-and-trade deal that also sent the Hawks a 2007 first round draft pick. In 2006–07, Harrington wore jersey #32 because his first choice #3 was worn by teammate Šarūnas Jasikevičius (saying it stands for "number three, and it's my second time around").

Golden State Warriors (2007–2008)

On January 17, 2007, Harrington was dealt to the Golden State Warriors along with teammates Stephen Jackson, Šarūnas Jasikevičius, and Josh Powell for Troy Murphy, Mike Dunleavy, Ike Diogu, and Keith McLeod.

New York Knicks (2008–2010)
On November 21, 2008, Harrington was traded to the New York Knicks in exchange for Jamal Crawford. In his two seasons with the Knicks, he played the best basketball of his career, but did not reach the playoffs in either season. In 140 games (66 starts), he averaged 19.2 points, 5.9 rebounds, 1.4 assists and 1.0 steals in 32.7 minutes per game.

Denver Nuggets (2010–2012)
On July 15, 2010, Harrington signed a multi-year deal with the Denver Nuggets.  During the 2010–11 season, he averaged 10.5 points, 4.5 rebounds, and 1.4 assists in 22.8 minutes per game. The Nuggets finished 50–32, fifth best in the Western Conference and second in the Northwest Division. The Oklahoma City Thunder defeated the Nuggets in five games in the first round of the 2011 playoffs.

Orlando Magic (2012–2013)
On August 10, 2012, Harrington was traded to the Orlando Magic in a four-team trade which sent Dwight Howard to the Los Angeles Lakers. He only played 10 games for the Magic in 2012–13, averaging 5.1 points, 2.7 rebounds, and 1.0 assists in 11.7 minutes per game. The Magic finished with a 20–62 record, the worst record in the NBA. On August 2, 2013, Harrington was waived by the Magic.

Washington Wizards (2013–2014)
On August 14, 2013, Harrington signed with the Washington Wizards. He came off the bench in all 37 games he played for Washington, averaging 6.6 points and 2.4 rebounds per contest. The Wizards made their first playoff appearance since 2008, and Harrington played in 7 of the team's 11 postseason games.

Fujian Sturgeons (2014)
On August 11, 2014, Harrington signed with the Fujian Sturgeons of the Chinese Basketball Association. On November 25, 2014, he parted ways with Fujian amidst NBA interest.

After returning to the United States and not receiving any NBA offers, Harrington announced his retirement from professional basketball on March 18, 2015, after averaging 13.5 points and 5.6 rebounds in a 16-year career that included stints with seven teams.

Sydney Kings (2015)
Harrington later came out of retirement and signed with the Sydney Kings of the National Basketball League on October 28, 2015 as an injury replacement for Josh Childress. He made his debut for the Kings two days later, scoring 12 points off the bench in an 87–78 win over the Townsville Crocodiles. With Childress set to return from injury, Harrington played his last game with Sydney on November 19, recording 18 points and 6 rebounds in a loss to the New Zealand Breakers. In six games for the Kings, he averaged 17.7 points, 6.8 rebounds, and 2.7 assists per game.

Big3 (2017)
In the summer of 2017, Harrington competed in the inaugural season of the Big3 basketball league. He played for Trilogy and served as co-captain with former teammate Kenyon Martin. The team went an undefeated 10–0 that season, winning the first-ever Big3 Championship.

Coaching career
On December 24, 2021, Harrington was announced as assistant coach of South Africa's Cape Town Tigers.

NBA career statistics

Regular season

|-
| align="left" | 
| align="left" | Indiana
| 21 || 0 || 7.6 || .321 || .000 || .600 || 1.9 || .2 || .2 || .1 || 2.1
|-
| align="left" | 
| align="left" | Indiana
| 50 || 0 || 17.1 || .458 || .235 || .703 || 3.2 || .8 || .5 || .2 || 6.6
|-
| align="left" | 
| align="left" | Indiana
| 78 || 38 || 24.3 || .444 || .143 || .656 || 4.9 || 1.7 || .8 || .2 || 7.5
|-
| align="left" | 
| align="left" | Indiana
| 44 || 1 || 29.8 || .475 || .333 || .799 || 6.3 || 1.2 || .9 || .5 || 13.1
|-
| align="left" | 
| align="left" | Indiana
| 82 || 37 || 30.1 || .434 || .283 || .770 || 6.2 || 1.5 || .9 || .4 || 12.2
|-
| align="left" | 
| align="left" | Indiana
| 79 || 15 || 30.9 || .463 || .273 || .734 || 6.4 || 1.7 || 1.0 || .3 || 13.3
|-
| align="left" | 
| align="left" | Atlanta
| 66 || 66 || 38.6 || .459 || .216 || .672 || 7.0 || 3.2 || 1.3 || .2 || 17.5
|-
| align="left" | 
| align="left" | Atlanta
| 76 || 76 || 36.6 || .452 || .346 || .694 || 6.9 || 3.1 || 1.1 || .2 || 18.6
|-
| align="left" | 
| align="left" | Indiana
| 36 || 36 || 33.6 || .458 || .458 || .713 || 6.3 || 1.4 || .7 || .3 || 15.9
|-
| align="left" | 
| align="left" | Golden State
| 42 || 42 || 32.3 || .456 || .417 || .681 || 6.4 || 2.3 || 1.0 || .3 || 17.0
|-
| align="left" | 
| align="left" | Golden State
| 81 || 59 || 27.0 || .434 || .375 || .774 || 5.4 || 1.6 || .9 || .2 || 13.6
|-
| align="left" | 
| align="left" | Golden State
| 5 || 5 || 33.2 || .329 || .393 || .500 || 5.6 || 2.0 || 1.4 || .0 || 12.4
|-
| align="left" | 
| align="left" | New York
| 68 || 51 || 35.0 || .446 || .362 || .804 || 6.3 || 1.4 || 1.2 || .3 || 20.7
|-
| align="left" | 
| align="left" | New York
| 72 || 15 || 30.5 || .435 || .342 || .757 || 5.6 || 1.5 || .9 || .4 || 17.7
|-
| align="left" | 
| align="left" | Denver
| 73 || 3 || 22.8 || .416 || .357 || .735 || 4.5 || 1.4 || .5 || .1 || 10.5
|-
| align="left" | 
| align="left" | Denver
| 64 || 1 || 27.5 || .446 || .333 || .676 || 6.1 || 1.4 || .9 || .2 || 14.2
|-
| align="left" | 
| align="left" | Orlando
| 10 || 0 || 11.9 || .351 || .267 || .750 || 2.7 || 1.0 || .4 || .1 || 5.1
|-
| align="left" | 
| align="left" | Washington
| 34 || 0 || 15.0 || .396 || .340 || .771 || 2.4 || .8 || .4 || .0 || 6.6
|-
| align="center" colspan=2| Career
| 981 || 445 || 28.6 || .444 || .352 || .727 || 5.6 || 1.7 || .9 || .3 || 13.5

Playoffs

|-
| align="left" | 2001
| align="left" | Indiana
| 3 || 0 || 13.3 || .154 || .000 || .500 || 1.3 || 1.0 || .0 || .0 || 1.7
|-
| align="left" | 2003
| align="left" | Indiana
| 6 || 0 || 17.2 || .212 || .000 || .667 || 3.7 || .8 || 1.0 || .5 || 3.0
|-
| align="left" | 2004
| align="left" | Indiana
| 16 || 2 || 26.7 || .429 || .400 || .545 || 6.4 || .8 || 1.4 || .6 || 9.5
|-
| align="left" | 2007
| align="left" | Golden State
| 11 || 5 || 23.8 || .398 || .395 || .633 || 4.6 || .5 || .5 || .6 || 10.2
|-
| align="left" | 2011
| align="left" | Denver
| 5 || 0 || 14.0 || .455 || .500 || .750 || 1.4 || 1.0 || .6 || .0 || 5.6
|-
| align="left" | 2012
| align="left" | Denver
| 7 || 0 || 23.3 || .320 || .286 || .667 || 4.3 || .9 || .4 || .1 || 9.7
|-
| style="text-align:left;"| 2014
| style="text-align:left;"| Washington
| 7 || 0 || 8.4 || .400 || .000 || .714 || 2.3 || .0 || .6 || .0 || 2.4
|-
| align="center" colspan=2| Career
| 55 || 7 || 20.4 || .374 || .317 || .605 || 4.2 || .7 || .8 || .4 || 7.3

Cannabis

Entrepreneurship
After retiring from the NBA, Harrington started a business that produces cannabis extracts.  The company, Viola Brands, is named after Harrington's grandmother.  Suffering from glaucoma and diabetes, she tried cannabis at the urging of Harrington and found significant relief.  The company cultivates cannabis in-house and has facilities in several states.

In February 2018 Harrington announced the launch of Harrington Wellness, a company that manufactures non-psychoactive cannabinoid products.  Also announced was his investment in a third company Butter Baby, which makes cannabis edibles.  All three companies together comprise The Harrington Group.

In July 2021, Harrington and NBA Hall of Famer Allen Iverson announced a partnership through which a line of cannabis products would be launched named "The Iverson Collection". As part of the partnership, Iverson will aid in the development of various business initiatives for Viola Brands.

In July 2022, Harrington announced a partnership with the National Basketball Players Association (NBPA) to promote his Re+Play line of CBD products, which will be sold by Amazon and Walmart.

Advocacy
Harrington is a proponent for the legalization of cannabis.  In October 2016, he appeared in an online ad endorsing the passage of California's Proposition 64.  He has also written an essay for The Players' Tribune titled "9 Reasons to End the War on Marijuana".

In October 2017, Harrington interviewed former NBA commissioner David Stern regarding cannabis use by players.  Stern told Harrington during the interview: "I'm now at the point where personally I think [cannabis] probably should be removed from the banned list.  You've persuaded me."

In January 2021, Harrington interviewed U.S. Senate Majority Leader Chuck Schumer about his efforts to end cannabis prohibition at the federal level.

See also
 List of oldest and youngest National Basketball Association players

References

External links

 NBA biography
 

1980 births
Living people
African-American basketball players
American cannabis activists
American expatriate basketball people in Australia
American expatriate basketball people in China
American men's basketball players
Atlanta Hawks players
Basketball players from New Jersey
Big3 players
Businesspeople in the cannabis industry
Denver Nuggets players
Fujian Sturgeons players
Golden State Warriors players
Indiana Pacers draft picks
Indiana Pacers players
McDonald's High School All-Americans
National Basketball Association high school draftees
New York Knicks players
Parade High School All-Americans (boys' basketball)
People from Orange, New Jersey
People from Roselle, New Jersey
Power forwards (basketball)
Small forwards
Sportspeople from Essex County, New Jersey
The Patrick School alumni
Sydney Kings players
21st-century African-American sportspeople
20th-century African-American people
American men's 3x3 basketball players